Gogana conwayi is a moth species in the family Drepanidae, first described by Jeremy Daniel Holloway in 1976. It is found on Borneo, at Mount Kinabalu. The species is known from only four specimens.

Appearance
Gogana conwayi is a pale yellow in color with fine brown banding on the wings. It somewhat resembles Euphalacra semisecta, but differs in size and shape of the hindwings.

Original publication
 (as Ametroptila conwayi).

References

Moths described in 1976
Drepaninae